Saint-Genix-sur-Guiers is a former commune in the Savoie department in the Auvergne-Rhône-Alpes region in south-eastern France. On 1 January 2019, it was merged into the new commune Saint-Genix-les-Villages.

Saint-Genix-sur-Guiers is known for its cakes (gâteau de Saint-Genix) that are filled and decorated with pink pralines.

See also
Communes of the Savoie department

References

External links

Official site

Former communes of Savoie